Acrocercops astericola is a moth of the family Gracillariidae, known from Canada (Québec and Nova Scotia) and the United States (Pennsylvania, Kentucky, Maine, Michigan, Vermont, Massachusetts and New York).

References

External links
Acrocercops at microleps.org
Bug Guide

astericola
Moths of North America
Moths described in 1873